Kahnak (also known as Kahnūk) is a village in Eskelabad Rural District, Nukabad District, Khash County, Sistan and Baluchestan Province, Iran. At the 2006 census, its population was 513, in 102 families.

References 

Populated places in Khash County